Cecil Carlon Shorts III (born December 22, 1987) is a former American football wide receiver. He attended Collinwood High School in Cleveland, Ohio, and later the University of Mount Union, where he played for the Mount Union Purple Raiders football team. He was drafted by the Jacksonville Jaguars in the fourth round of the 2011 NFL Draft.

Early years
Shorts attended
Collinwood High School in Cleveland, Ohio, where he played quarterback on the football team that his father, Cecil Shorts, Jr., coached.

College career
During his freshman season, Shorts suffered an injury that kept him from playing the entire year. In 2007, he was the backup quarterback, along with Kurt Rocco, to Greg Micheli, but was 16 of 24 passing for 209 yards, made 12 receptions, three for a touchdown, for 289 and ran for 108 yards with two touchdowns in 14 games played. Shorts switched to wide receiver after Pierre Garçon graduated, and immediately became the top receiver for Mount Union. In 2008, Shorts caught 77 passes for 1,484 yards and 23 touchdowns, which set an Ohio Athletic Conference record. Shorts helped Mount Union win their 10th NCAA Division III National Championship, at Amos Alonzo Stagg Bowl XXXVI.

In 2009, he was named the D3Football.com National Offensive Player of the Year after recording 100 receptions for 1,736 yards with 19 touchdowns. For his efforts, he earned Associated Press first-team Little All-America honors following the season. In the 2009 NCAA Division III National Football Championship on December 19, 2009 against the UW–Whitewater Warhawks, Shorts caught 10 passes for 185 yards and two touchdowns. The Purple Raiders lost, however, by a score of 38–28.

In 2010, Shorts' play was hampered by an ankle injury that prevented him from playing in three games. He finished the season with 18 receiving touchdowns, three return touchdowns and one rushing touchdown. He earned Associated Press first-team Little All-America honors for the second consecutive year following the season. Shorts had 4,705 receiving yards for 63 touchdowns in his career.  He was considered a top wide receiver prospect in the 2011 NFL Draft.

Professional career

Jacksonville Jaguars
Shorts was drafted by the Jacksonville Jaguars with the 114th overall pick (4th round) in the 2011 NFL Draft. Shorts is the highest drafted player in Mount Union history and first player drafted by the Jaguars from a Division III school in franchise history. Shorts played sparingly in his rookie season, catching only two passes for 30 yards and a touchdown in 10 games. He missed the final six games in 2011 with a hamstring injury. In 2012, despite Jacksonville sharing an NFL-worst record of 2–14 with the Kansas City Chiefs, Shorts was a bright spot, leading the team in receiving yards (979), yards per reception (17.8), and touchdowns (7), with five touchdowns going for 40 yards or longer. He was placed on season-ending injured reserve on December 24, 2012 due to a concussion. In 2013, Shorts recorded 66 catches for 777 yards and three touchdowns. He was placed on injured reserve on December 17, 2013 with a groin injury. Shorts caught 53 catches for 577 yards and 1 touchdown. Shorts became a free agent after the 2014 season.

Houston Texans
On March 16, 2015, Shorts signed a two-year, $6 million contract with the Houston Texans. On November 22, 2015, Shorts threw a touchdown pass to running back Alfred Blue on a trick play against the New York Jets. On June 18, 2016, Shorts signed a pay cut reducing his salary to $1.2 million with $750,000 in bonuses. On September 3, 2016, he was released by the Texans.

Tampa Bay Buccaneers 
On September 6, 2016, Shorts was signed by the Tampa Bay Buccaneers. He was placed on injured reserve on December 6, 2016 after tearing his ACL, MCL, and PCL.

NFL statistics

References

External links
Mount Union Purple Raiders football bio
Jacksonville Jaguars bio
Houston Texans bio

1987 births
Living people
Players of American football from Cleveland
American football wide receivers
American football quarterbacks
American football return specialists
Mount Union Purple Raiders football players
Jacksonville Jaguars players
Houston Texans players
Tampa Bay Buccaneers players